Christopher Jones (23 June 1884 in Penarth – 18 December 1937) was a British water polo player who competed in the 1920 Summer Olympics. He was part of the British team which won the gold medal.

See also
 Great Britain men's Olympic water polo team records and statistics
 List of Olympic champions in men's water polo
 List of Olympic medalists in water polo (men)

References

External links

 

1884 births
1937 deaths
Sportspeople from Penarth
Welsh male water polo players
British male water polo players
Water polo players at the 1920 Summer Olympics
Olympic water polo players of Great Britain
Olympic gold medallists for Great Britain
Olympic medalists in water polo
Welsh Olympic medallists
Medalists at the 1920 Summer Olympics